Arvind Singh (born 17 June 1996 in Khabra village of Bulandshahr district in Uttar Pradesh) is an Indian professional rower. He is currently serving in the Indian Army.

Early life 
Arvind Singh hails from Bulandshahr and his father was a farmer. He joined the army in 2016.

Career

2020 Summer Olympics
Arvind Singh qualified for the 2020 Olympic Games after finishing second at the Asia/Oceania Continental Qualifying Regatta  event in Tokyo, Japan and on the allocation of an Asian & Oceania Qualification Regatta spots and now he will represent India Team at the Men's Lightweight double sculls Event  in Rowing at the 2020 Summer Olympics of the 2020 Summer Olympics in Tokyo, Japan.

References

Living people
1996 births
Place of birth missing (living people)
Indian male rowers
Sportspeople from Uttar Pradesh
Rowers at the 2020 Summer Olympics
Olympic rowers of India